Myosin IG, also known as myosin 1G and MYO1G, is a protein that in humans is encoded by the MYO1G gene. MYO1G is a member of class I unconventional myosins. Its expression is highly restricted to hematopoietic tissues and cells. It localises exclusively to the plasma membrane and is dependent on both the motor domain and the tail domain. MYO1G regulates cell elasticity possibly by interaction plasma membrane and cortical actin in Jurkat T-cells.

Function

MYO1G is a plasma membrane-associated class I myosin (see MIM 601478) that is abundant in T and B lymphocytes and mast cells (Pierce et al., 2001 [PubMed 11544309]; Patino-Lopez et al., 2010 [PubMed 20071333]).[supplied by OMIM, Jun 2010].

References

Further reading 

Motor proteins